See British Home Championship for the football competition. - 

The British Championship is the most prestigious ice hockey cup competition in the United Kingdom, and also the longest established ice hockey competition.

The competition is effectively the post-season playoffs of the first-tier league in the country to determine the British champions for the season. They are therefore held after the regular season, whereby the positions in the league ladder determine entry and seeding. The first placed team in the league is considered to have won the national league title as a separate title, but the British champion for the season is historically considered to be the winner of the post-season playoffs.

In its current format, the eight highest placed teams in the first-tier Elite Ice Hockey League contest quarter finals, the winners going on to semi finals and then the deciding one-leg final.

Early Years

There were three instances of an early championship; the first was in the 1929-30 British Ice Hockey season which was the inaugural season of organised league ice hockey in Britain. The championship was won by London Lions when known as the Patton Cup. The second edition the following season was abandoned after Manchester and Glasgow couldn't agree on dates for their semi-final tie. The winner was to have met the English Club champions London Lions in the final. The third instance took place during the 1959–60 British National League season.

Modern edition

From 1966 it became an annual event when known as the Icy Smith Cup and then after 1982 it had several sponsors and names including the Heineken Championship Cup and latterly as the Sekonda Playoff Championship Cup.  Some contests were only recognised as representing the Championship retroactively. At present, the Championship is called the Twinings Tea Cup.

Champions

References 

Ice hockey competitions in the United Kingdom
Ice hockey tournaments in Europe
National championships in the United Kingdom